The women's discus throw event at the 1993 Summer Universiade was held at the UB Stadium in Buffalo, United States on 16 and 17 July 1993.

Medalists

Results

Qualification

Final

References

Athletics at the 1993 Summer Universiade
1993 in women's athletics
1993